Unschooling is an informal learning that advocates learner-chosen activities as a primary means for learning. Unschoolers learn through their natural life experiences including play, household responsibilities, personal interests and curiosity, internships and work experience, travel, books, elective classes, family, mentors, and social interaction. Often considered a lesson- and curriculum-free implementation of homeschooling, unschooling encourages exploration of activities initiated by the children themselves, believing that the more personal learning is, the more meaningful, well-understood and therefore useful it is to the child. While courses may occasionally be taken, unschooling questions the usefulness of standard curricula, fixed times at which learning should take place, conventional grading methods in standardized tests, forced contact with children in their own age group, the compulsion to do homework, regardless of whether it helps the learner in their individual situation, the effectiveness of listening to and obeying the orders of one authority figure for several hours each day, and other features of traditional schooling in the education of each unique child.

The term unschooling was coined in the 1970s and used by educator John Holt, widely regarded as the father of unschooling. Even though unschooling is often seen as a subset of homeschooling and homeschooling has been the subject of broad public debate, unschooling in particular has received relatively little media attention and has only become increasingly popular in recent years.

Critics of unschooling see it as an extreme educational philosophy, with concerns that unschooled children will be neglected, miss many things that are important for their future life, lack the social skills, structure, discipline, and motivation of their schooled peers, and will not be able to cope with uncomfortable situations. Proponents of unschooling say exactly the opposite is true: that self-directed education in a non-academic, often natural and diversified environment is a far more efficient, sustainable and child-friendly form of education than schooling, which preserves the innate curiosity, pleasure and willingness in discovering and learning new things, invites children to be part of society, shows children how to deal with their surroundings and own existence in a self-determined and yet responsible manner, makes children understand why certain properties, skills, abilities, values and norms are important rather than just telling them to obtain and adhere to them, rewards and supports creativity, individuality and innovation, teaches how to acquire new things and find your way in unfamiliar situations quickly, and better equips a child to handle the "real world" outside of school.

History

The term unschooling probably derives from Ivan Illich's term deschooling, and was popularized through John Holt's newsletter Growing Without Schooling (GWS). Holt is also widely regarded as the father of unschooling. In an early essay, Holt contrasted the two terms:

GWS will say 'unschooling' when we mean taking children out of school, and 'deschooling' when we mean changing the laws to make schools non-compulsory...

At this point the term was equivalent with home schooling (itself a neologism). Subsequently, home schoolers began to differentiate between various educational philosophies within home schooling. The term unschooling became used as a contrast to versions of home schooling that were perceived as politically and pedagogically "school-like," using textbooks and exercises at home, the same way they would be used at school. In 2003, in Holt's book Teach Your Own (originally published in 1981), Pat Farenga, co-author of the new edition, provided a definition:

When pressed, I define unschooling as allowing children as much freedom to learn in the world as their parents can comfortably bear.

In the same passage Holt stated that he was not entirely comfortable with this term, and that he would have preferred the term living.  Holt's use of the term emphasizes learning as a natural process, integrated into the spaces and activities of everyday life, and not benefiting from adult manipulation. It follows closely on the themes of educational philosophies proposed by Jean-Jacques Rousseau, Jiddu Krishnamurti, Paul Goodman, and A.S. Neill.

After Holt's death a range of unschooling practitioners and observers defined the term in various ways. For instance, the Freechild Project defines unschooling as:

the process of learning through life, without formalized or institutionalized classrooms or schoolwork.

New Mexico homeschooling parent Sandra Dodd proposed the term radical unschooling to emphasize the complete rejection of any distinction between educational and non-educational activities. Radical unschooling emphasizes that unschooling is a non-coercive, cooperative practice, and seeks to promote those values in all areas of life. These usages share an opposition to traditional schooling techniques and the social construction of schools. Most emphasize the integration of learning into the everyday life of the family and wider community. Points of disagreement include whether unschooling is primarily defined by the initiative of the learner and their control over the curriculum, or by the techniques, methods, and spaces being used.

Peter Gray suggested the term self-directed education, which has fewer negative connotations.

Even though unschooling is often seen as a subset of homeschooling and homeschooling has been the subject of broad public debate, unschooling in particular has received relatively little media attention and has only become increasingly popular in recent years. Unschooling is also sometimes considered the freest form of homeschooling.

Motivations 

There are a variety of complex reasons why parents choose to unschool their children, many of which overlap with those for homeschooling.

Unschoolers question schools for lessening the parent/child bond and reducing family time and creating atmospheres of fear, or atmospheres that are not conducive for learning and may not even correspond with later success. Some unschoolers criticize that in schools, children are taught a set of facts and skills that they might not need in the future anymore, while with unschooling, they learn how to learn, which is far more sustainable for their life. Also, some say that in school, children are only taught how to follow instructions, which means that they face problems with doing tasks they have not done before. Another argument is that the structure of school is not suitable for people who want to make their own decisions about what, when, how and with whom they learn because many things are predetermined there, while you are more free in these decisions when unschooled.

Often those in school have a community consisting mainly of a peer group, of which the parent has little influence and even knowledge. Unschoolers may have time to share a role in their greater community, therefore relating more to older and younger individuals and finding their place within more diverse groups of people. Parents of school children also have little say regarding who their instructors and teachers are, whereas parents of unschoolers may be more involved in the selection of the coaches or mentors their children work with and with whom they build lasting and ongoing relationships.

According to unschooling pioneer John Holt, child-led learning is more efficient and respectful of children's time, takes advantage of their interests, and allows deeper exploration of subjects than what is possible in conventional education.
"...the anxiety children feel at constantly being tested, their fear of failure, punishment, and disgrace, severely reduces their ability both to perceive and to remember, and drives them away from the material being studied into strategies for fooling teachers into thinking they know what they really don't know."

Others point out that some schools can be non-coercive and cooperative, in a manner consistent with the philosophies behind unschooling. Sudbury model schools are non-coercive, non-indoctrinative, cooperative, democratically run partnerships between children and adults, including full parents' partnership, where learning is individualized and child-led, and complements home education.

Concerns about socialization can also be a factor in the decision to unschool. Some unschoolers believe that conditions in conventional schools, such as age segregation, the ratio of children to adults, or the amount of time spent sitting and obeying orders of one authority figure, are not conducive to proper education.

Unschooling is claimed to broaden the diversity of people or places an unschooler may be exposed to. Unschoolers may be more mature than their schooled peers on average, and some believe this is a result of the wide range of people they have the opportunity to interact with. Opportunities for unschoolers to meet and interact with other unschoolers has increased in recent years, allowing unschoolers to have interactions with other children with similar experiences.

Methods and philosophy

Natural learning

A fundamental premise of unschooling is that learning is a natural process constantly taking place and that curiosity is innate and children want to learn. From this, an argument can be made that institutionalizing children in a so-called "one size fits all" or "factory model" school is an inefficient use of the children's time and potential, because it requires each child to learn specific subject matter in a particular manner, at a particular pace, and at a specific time regardless of that individual's present or future needs, interests, goals, or any pre-existing knowledge they might have about the topic.

Many unschoolers believe that opportunities for valuable hands-on, community-based, spontaneous, and real-world experiences may be missed when educational opportunities are limited to, or dominated by, those inside a school building.

Learning styles
Unschoolers note that psychologists have documented many differences between children in the way they learn, and assert that unschooling is better equipped to adapt to these differences.

People vary in their "learning styles", that is, the preference in how they acquire new information. However, research has demonstrated no evidence of such learning styles and that this preference is not related to increased learning or improved performance. Students have different learning needs. In a traditional school setting, teachers seldom evaluate an individual student differently from other students, and while teachers often use different methods, this is sometimes haphazard and not always with regard to an individual student.

Developmental differences
Developmental psychologists note that just as children reach growth milestones at different ages from each other, children are also prepared to learn different things at different ages. Just as some children learn to walk during a normal range of eight to fifteen months, and begin to talk across an even larger range, unschoolers assert that they are also ready and able to read, for example, at different ages, girls usually earlier than boys. In fact, experts have discovered that natural learning produces far greater changes in behavior than do traditional learning methods, though not necessarily an increase in the amount of information learned. Traditional education requires all children to begin reading at the same time and do multiplication at the same time; unschoolers believe that some children cannot help but be bored because this was something that they had been ready to learn earlier, and even worse, some children cannot help but fail, because they are not yet ready for this new information being taught.

Essential body of knowledge
Unschoolers sometimes state that learning any specific subject is less important than learning how to learn. They assert, in the words of Holt:

Since we can't know what knowledge will be most needed in the future, it is senseless to try to teach it in advance. Instead, we should try to turn out people who love learning so much and learn so well that they will be able to learn whatever must be learned.

It is asserted that this ability to learn on their own makes it more likely that later, when these children are adults, they can continue to learn what they need to know to meet newly emerging needs, interests, and goals; and that they can return to any subject that they feel was not sufficiently covered or learn a completely new subject.

Many unschoolers disagree that there is a particular body of knowledge that every person, regardless of the life they lead, needs to possess.  Unschoolers argue that, in the words of John Holt,  "If children are given access to enough of the world, they will see clearly enough what things are truly important to themselves and to others, and they will make for themselves a better path into that world than anyone else could make for them."

The role of parents
Parents of unschoolers provide resources, support, guidance, information, and advice to facilitate experiences that aid their children in accessing, navigating, and making sense of the world.  Common parental activities include sharing interesting books, articles, and activities with their children, helping them find knowledgeable people to explore an interest with (anyone from physics professors to automotive mechanics), and helping them set goals and figure out what they need to do to meet their goals. Unschooling's interest-based nature does not mean that it is a "hands-off" approach to education. Parents tend to involve themselves, especially with younger children (older children, unless new to unschooling, often need less help finding resources and making and carrying out plans).

Paradigm shift 
Unschooling opposes many aspects of what the dominant culture insists are true, and it may be impossible to fully understand the unschooling philosophy of education without both active participation and a major paradigm shift. The cognitive dissonance that frequently accompanies this paradigm shift is uncomfortable. New unschoolers are advised that they should not expect to understand the unschooling philosophy at first. Not only are there many commonplace assumptions about education, there are many unspoken and unwritten expectations. One step towards overcoming the necessary paradigm shift is accepting that "what we do is nowhere near as important as why we do it."

While opponents of the concept of unschooling criticize the fact that it cannot be ensured that children receive a neutral, comprehensive education and fear that children may be at the mercy of bad parents, resulting in parallel societies, many advocates of unschooling doubt that or at least question whether such an education exists universally objectively seen and note that in school, people do not learn a lot of what they are guaranteed to need for their life either and that when unschooled, more efficient and independent learning guided by their own interests increases the probability that children will be well equipped for their future life because they learned how to learn and already roughly know what they are interested in and some things about these areas. They also find that children can be at least just as much at the mercy of one or more bad teachers and classmates in school and consider it exceedingly unrealistic that parents would completely isolate their children from external social influences or even criticize school as an institution in which children are fobbed off from the outside world and therefore see school itself as a parallel society. From then on, it is only a subjective decision as to where, when, how and with whom education should take place, which those to be educated should answer themselves, or, if necessary, with people directly involved in their education, like their parents or other people who educate them.

Unschooling compared to other homeschooling forms

Unschooling is a form of homeschooling, which is the education of children at home or other places rather than in a school. It involves teaching children based on their interests rather than a set curriculum.

Unschooling contrasts with other forms of homeschooling in that the student's education is not directed by a teacher and curriculum. Unschooling is a real-world implementation of the open classroom methods promoted in the late 1960s and early 1970s, without the school, classrooms or grades. Parents who unschool their children act as facilitators, providing a range of resources, helping their children access, navigate, and make sense of the world, and aiding them in making and implementing goals and plans for both the distant and immediate future. Unschooling expands from children's natural curiosity as an extension of their interests, concerns, needs, goals, and plans.

Unschooling differs from discovery learning, minimally invasive education, purpose-guided education, academic advising, phenomenon-based learning and thematic learning.

Branches
There are many different branches, possibilities, and approaches of designing and practicing unschooling, some of the most popular include the following:
 Worldschooling, in which families travel around the world and learn through experiencing other places, people, cultures, and activities typical for these locations.
 Project-based unschooling, which holds that students acquire a deeper knowledge through active exploration of real-world challenges, problems and projects that they can do in their own way and time.
 Gameschooling, in which various games like board and card games are important to homeschool learning method, and educational philosophy. In addition to developing skills in math, language, history, board games are also used to develop social skills such as interpersonal communication, negotiation, persuasion, diplomacy, and moral character such as good sportsmanship.

Complementary philosophies

Some unschooling families may incorporate the following philosophies into their lifestyles. 
Unconditional Parenting and Punished by Rewards, parenting and education books by Alfie Kohn.
The continuum concept, attachment parenting, and attachment theory, theories and practices attempting to encourage the child's development.
Voluntaryism: the idea that all forms of human association should be voluntary, as far as possible. Consequently, voluntaryism opposes the initiation of aggressive force or coercion.

Other forms of alternative education 
Many other forms of alternative education also place a great deal of importance on student control of learning, albeit not necessarily of the individual learner. This includes free democratic schools, like the Sudbury school, Stonesoup School and "open learning" virtual universities.

Criticism 

As a form of homeschooling, unschooling faces much of the same critiques as homeschooling itself. Criticisms levied against unschooling in particular tend to focus on whether or not students can receive a sufficient education with very little structure compared to more standard schooling practices. Some critics maintain that building the motivation necessary for students to learn without guardrails can be difficult, and that some students might be left behind as a result. Without enough motivation or interest in critical areas, it is argued, unschooling students might fare poorly against their peers.

In a 2006 study of five- to ten-year-olds, unschooling children scored below traditionally schooled children in four of seven studied categories, and significantly below structured homeschoolers in all seven studied categories.

See also 

 Anti-schooling activism
 Alternative school
 Anarchistic free school
 Autodidacticism
 Democratic education
 Deschooling Society
 Gifted education
 Montessori method
 Not Back to School Camp, an annual gathering of over 100 unschoolers ages 13 to 18
 Reggio Emilia approach
 Special education
 Taking Children Seriously
 The Teenage Liberation Handbook: How to Quit School and Get a Real Life and Education
 Waldorf Education

Persons of interest

 Catherine Baker
 Albert Cullum, elementary school teacher from 1960s
 John Taylor Gatto, New York City's 1989 Teacher of the Year, New York State Teacher of the Year 1991
 Charlotte Thomson Iserbyt
 Grace Llewellyn, author/advocate/speaker/camp director
 Wendy Priesnitz
 Daniel Quinn, author/cultural critic
 Ken Robinson

Adult unschoolers of note
 Sawyer Fredericks, singer/songwriter, The Voice (U.S. season 8)
 Lisa Harvey-Smith, astronomer
 Peter Kowalke
 Dale J. Stephens, entrepreneur, speaker, author, and founder of UnCollege
 Aaron Swartz, political activist and computer programmer
 Astra Taylor, filmmaker
 Sunny Taylor, painter and disability activist (also younger sister of Astra Taylor)

References

Further reading

Books 

 
 
 
 
 The Underground History of American Education by John Taylor Gatto (complete download)

Essays and articles 
 "Why Schools Don't Educate - Teacher of the Year acceptance speech"
 Everything We Think About Schooling Is Wrong! – Interview with Gatto (PDF file download)
 What is Self-Directed Education?

External links 
 
 Joyfully Rejoycing by Joyce Fetteroll
 Living Joyfully with Unschooling by Pam Laricchia

Homeschooling
Pedagogy
Philosophy of education
Alternative education
Lifestyles